This is a list of the members of the 8th Riigikogu, following the 1995 election.

Election results

Lists

By party

Coalition Party and Country Union (41)

Estonian Reform Party (19)

Estonian Centre Party (16)

RKEI and ERSP (8)

Moderates (6)

Our Home is Estonia (6)

The Right Wingers (5)

By votes

References

8th